Anastasia Spyridonidou (born 11 June 1997) is a Greek footballer who plays as an attacking midfielder for PAOK FC and the Greece women's national team.

International goals

References

1997 births
Living people
Women's association football midfielders
Greece women's international footballers
PAOK FC (women) players
Zaragoza CFF players
Primera División (women) players
Greek expatriate women's footballers
Greek expatriate sportspeople in Spain
Expatriate women's footballers in Spain
Footballers from Veria
Greek women's footballers